Podolasiini is a tribe of May beetles and junebugs in the family Scarabaeidae. There are at least 2 genera and about 18 described species in Podolasiini.

Genera
These two genera belong to the tribe Podolasiini:
 Podolasia Harold, 1869
 Podostena Howden, 1997

References

Further reading

 
 
 
 
 
 

Melolonthinae
Articles created by Qbugbot